Park Jungsang (born 23 August 1984) is a Korean professional Go player.

Biography 
Park was born in South Korea. He became a professional in 2000, and was promoted to 4 dan in 2003. In 2004, he won his first Go competition, the SK Gas Cup. In 2006, he pulled upset victories over top players from China, South Korea, and Japan to win the 19th Fujitsu Cup. It continued South Korea's successive run of 9 straight tournament wins. His rank was increased to 6 dan due to the win. He was promoted to 9 dan in 2006. Park is active in game commentary for KBS since 2013.

Promotion record

Career record
2006: 62 wins, 32 losses
2007: 59 wins, 32 losses
2008: 52 wins, 28 losses
2009: 30 wins, 21 losses
2010: 41 wins, 19 losses

Titles & runners-up

Korean Baduk League

References

External links
Profile at GoGameWorld

Living people
1984 births
South Korean Go players